Kileleshwa is a residential neighbourhood in the city of Nairobi. The neighbourhood was originally a low-density leafy suburb but after change in zoning regulations in the early 2000s, there has been significant mushrooming of high-rise flats in the area. It hosts mainly the middle income segment of the Nairobi residents.

Location
It is east of Lavington; south of Muthangari; west of Kilimani, mainly separated by the Kirichwa River.

Overview
The neighbourhood was established as a whites-only residential area by the British colonialists in the mid 20th century. It was not until the 1960s when it was racially integrated. The neighbourhood has historically been primarily low-density residential, but since early 2000s, Kileleshwa and its environs have become increasingly high-density mixed residential and commercial; both retail and offices, due to the zoning laws in the area being changed.

Kileleshwa, an electoral ward within the Dagoretti North Constituency, borrows its name from the estate, encompassing other estates and neighbourhoods such as: Chiromo, Groganville, Kileleshwa, Muthangari and Riverside.

As per the 2019 census, Kileleshwa had a population of 22,216, with a population density of 4,229/km2 in a land area of 5.3km2.

Points of interest
 Schools
The Kenya High School is located in Kileleshwa.

References

Suburbs of Nairobi
Nairobi